Rois is a municipality of northwestern Spain in the province of A Coruña in the autonomous community of Galicia. It belongs to the comarca of Sar and it is located in the Southwest of the province of A Coruña.

References

Municipalities in the Province of A Coruña